Bolma microconcha is a species of sea snail, a marine gastropod mollusk in the family Turbinidae, the turban snails.

Description
The size the shell varies between 9 mm and 13 mm.

Distribution
This marine species occurs off the Philippines Sabah and Malaysia

References

External links
 To World Register of Marine Species
 

microconcha
Gastropods described in 1985